Thomas (Tom) Taylor (18 October 1753 at Ropley, Hampshire – April 1806 at Alresford, Hampshire) was a famous English cricketer who played for the Hambledon Club.  He is generally regarded as one of the most outstanding players of the 18th century.

A famous all-rounder, he made his debut in 1775 and played till 1798.  He played mainly for Hampshire but also made a number of appearances for Berkshire at a time when the county had a first-class team.

It was said of Taylor (see Haygarth and Nyren in particular) that he was an "admirable" cover field and a strong thrower.  As a batsman, he was a great hitter but "didn’t guard his wicket well enough" and had a tendency to cut at straight balls "like Beauclerk later".  He was also an effective bowler and took many wickets, though we don't know what his pace was.  Nyren commends Taylor on his fielding and says he was one of the best ever seen.

In August 1786, Taylor and Tom Walker scored the third and fourth known first-class centuries in the same innings for White Conduit Club v Kent at Bourne Paddock.  Taylor made 117, his highest known career score.

Thomas Taylor made 105 known first-class appearances from 1775 to 1798.

Taylor was another cricketing innkeeper.  He had the Globe Inn at Alresford.

References
 Fresh Light on 18th Century Cricket by G B Buckley (FL18)
 The Dawn of Cricket by H T Waghorn (WDC)
 Scores & Biographies, Volume 1 by Arthur Haygarth (SBnnn)
 The Glory Days of Cricket by Ashley Mote (GDC)
 John Nyren's "The Cricketers of my Time" by Ashley Mote

English cricketers
Hampshire cricketers
English cricketers of 1701 to 1786
English cricketers of 1787 to 1825
1753 births
1806 deaths
People from Ropley
Hambledon cricketers
Marylebone Cricket Club cricketers
White Conduit Club cricketers
Left-Handed v Right-Handed cricketers
East Kent cricketers
Colonel C. Lennox's XI cricketers
Hampshire and Marylebone Cricket Club cricketers